The Division of McMillan was an Australian Electoral Division in the state of Victoria. It was located in the western part of the Gippsland region, which extends for the length of Victoria's eastern Bass Strait coastline. It included the outer south-eastern Melbourne suburb of Pakenham, and also included the towns of Warragul, Moe, Wonthaggi, Leongatha and Foster. It stretched from Mount Baw Baw and the Baw Baw National Park in the north to Wilsons Promontory, and the Wilsons Promontory National Park in the south. It was the southernmost electoral division in continental Australia. It was replaced by the Division of Monash in 2019.

History

The Division was proclaimed at the redistribution of 11 May 1949, and was first contested at the 1949 election. It was named after Angus McMillan, a mass murderer and early European explorer in the Gippsland region responsible for the Gippsland massacres. The seat traded hands between the conservative parties from its creation until Labor finally won it in 1980.  The Division has changed hands five times in the last seven Federal elections. The change at the 2004 election was attributed to the redistribution of 29 January 2003, which removed the traditionally Labor-voting cities of Traralgon and Morwell from the Division. This allowed Liberal Russell Broadbent to win the seat once again; he had previously held it from 1996 to 1998.  Broadbent was re-elected in the 2007 election.

The 1972 federal election saw Country Party candidate Arthur Hewson win the seat from third place and a primary vote of 16.6%. This is the lowest primary vote for a winning candidate in any federal election; Hewson overtook the Liberal candidate on preferences from the Democratic Labor Party and disendorsed sitting Liberal MP Alex Buchanan, and then defeated the Labor candidate on Liberal preferences.

The division was renamed to the Division of Monash in 2018.

Members

Election results

References

External links
 Division of McMillan - Australian Electoral Commission

Former electoral divisions of Australia
Constituencies established in 1949
Constituencies disestablished in 2019
1949 establishments in Australia